Rafael Nadal was the defending champion, but chose not to participate that year.

Nicolás Massú won in the final 6–3, 6–4, against Alberto Martín.

Seeds

Draw

Finals

Top half

Bottom half

External links
 Draw
 Qualifying Draw

- Singles, 2006 Brasil Open